The 1950 Formula One season was the fourth season of the FIA's Formula One motor racing. It featured the inaugural FIA World Championship of Drivers, which commenced on 13 May and ended on 3 September, as well as several non-championship races. The championship consisted of six Grand Prix races, each held in Europe and open to Formula One cars, plus the Indianapolis 500, which was run to AAA National Championship regulations. Giuseppe Farina won the championship from Juan Manuel Fangio and Luigi Fagioli.

Championship summary

The inaugural World Championship of Drivers saw Alfa Romeo dominate with their supercharged 158, a well-developed pre-war design that debuted in 1938; this car won all six championship Grands Prix in 1950. All of the Formula One-regulated races in the championship were run in Europe. The Indianapolis 500 (which, unlike all the other races, was staged on an oval) was run to American AAA regulations, not FIA Formula One regulations, and none of the regular drivers who competed in Europe competed in the 500, and vice versa. Alfa Romeo drivers consequently dominated the championship with Italian Giuseppe "Nino" Farina edging out Argentine teammate Juan Manuel Fangio because of his fourth place in Belgium. Although the Indianapolis 500, which ran to different regulations, was included in the World Championship each year from 1950 to 1960, it attracted very little European participation and, conversely, very few American Indianapolis drivers entered any Grands Prix.

Championship points were awarded to the top five finishers in each race on an 8–6–4–3–2 basis, and 1 point was awarded for the fastest lap of each race. Points for shared drives were divided equally between the drivers, regardless of how many laps each driver completed during the race. Only the best four results from the seven races could be retained by each driver for World Championship classification.

Race 1: Britain

The Alfa Romeo team dominated the British Grand Prix at the fast Silverstone circuit in England, locking out the four-car front row of the grid. With King George VI in attendance, Giuseppe Farina won the race from pole position, also setting the fastest lap. The podium was completed by his teammates Luigi Fagioli and Reg Parnell, while the remaining Alfa driver, Juan Manuel Fangio, was forced to retire after experiencing problems with his engine. The final points scorers were the works Talbot-Lagos of Yves Giraud-Cabantous and Louis Rosier, both two laps behind the leaders.

Race 2: Monaco

Scuderia Ferrari made their World Championship debut around the streets of Monaco. Their leading drivers, Luigi Villoresi and Alberto Ascari had to settle for the third row of the grid, however, while the Alfa Romeos of Fangio and Farina again started from the front row, alongside the privateer Maserati of José Froilán González. Polesitter Fangio took a comfortable victory, setting the race's fastest lap, a whole lap ahead of Ascari, with the third-placed Louis Chiron a further lap back in the works Maserati. A first-lap accident caused by the damp track had eliminated nine of the nineteen starters—including Farina and Fagioli—while González, who had incurred damage in the pile-up, retired on the following lap. Villoresi, although delayed by the accident, had made his way through the field to second place but was forced to retire with an axle problem. Fangio's win brought him level with Farina in the points standings.

Race 3: Indianapolis 500

The Indianapolis 500, the third round of the inaugural World Championship of Drivers held at the Indianapolis Motor Speedway in Indianapolis, Indiana, in the United States, was won by the Kurtis Kraft-Offenhauser of Johnnie Parsons, ahead of the Deidt-Offenhausers of Bill Holland and Mauri Rose. The race was stopped after 138 of the scheduled 200 laps due to rain.

Race 4: Switzerland

Alfa Romeo's dominance continued when the World Championship returned to Europe for the Swiss Grand Prix at the tree-lined Bremgarten circuit outside Bern. Fangio, Farina, and Fagioli locked out the front row of the grid for Alfa, while the Ferraris of Villoresi and Ascari started from the second row. Fangio was the initial leader, starting from pole position, but Farina passed him on lap seven. Ascari and Villoresi were both able to  compete with the third Alfa of Fagioli in the early stages, although both had retired by the ten-lap mark. Farina took the win and the fastest lap, finishing just ahead of Fagioli, while Rosier, in third place due to Fangio's retirement, took Talbot-Lago's first podium. Farina's second win of the season put him six points clear of the consistent Fagioli, while Fangio was a further three points behind, having only scored points in one race (in Monaco, where he won).

Race 5: Belgium

Alfa Romeo took their third front row lockout of the season at the Belgian Grand Prix at the speedy  Spa-Francorchamps circuit, while the Ferrari of Villoresi shared the second row with the privateer Talbot-Lago of Raymond Sommer. The Alfas were once again untouchable at the start of the race, but when they stopped for fuel, Sommer emerged as an unlikely race leader. His lead, however, was short-lived, and he was forced to retire when his engine blew up. Fangio ultimately took the victory, ahead of Fagioli, who again finished second. Rosier again made the podium in his Talbot-Lago. He had been able to pass the polesitter Farina when the Italian picked up transmission problems towards the end of the race. It was not all bad for Farina, however, as he picked up the point for fastest lap. Fagioli and Fangio closed the gap to Farina in the points standings—Fagioli was just four points adrift, while Fangio was a further point behind.

Race 6: France

At Reims-Gueux, Alfa Romeo was largely unchallenged at the French Grand Prix at the high-speed Reims-Gueux circuit due to the withdrawal of the works Ferraris of Ascari and Villoresi. The Alfas produced yet another lockout of the front row of the grid, with Fangio taking pole for the third time in six races. The power of the Alfas suited this public road circuit- made up entirely of long straights, and Farina, starting from second, led for the first quarter of the race before fuel problems put him to the back of the field. He fought back to third before he was forced to retire (he was ultimately classified seventh). Fangio picked up the fastest lap on his way to his second consecutive victory. Fagioli finished second for the fourth time out of five starts, while Peter Whitehead, in a privateer Ferrari, took a maiden podium in his first start of the season. Fangio took the championship lead as a result of his victory. Fagioli remained in second, while Farina dropped to third, four points behind his Argentinian teammate.

Race 7: Italy

The final championship round of the season was the Italian Grand Prix at the Monza Autodrome near Milan, and all three of the regular Alfa Romeo drivers were in contention for the title. If Fangio finished first or second, he would win the title, regardless of where his teammates finished. If Farina failed to score at least five points, he would be unable to take the title. Fagioli's only chance of becoming World Champion was if he won the race and set the fastest lap; even then, he would need Farina to finish no higher than third, and Fangio would have to score no points at all.

Fangio again took pole position, but Alfa Romeo could not make it a fifth front-row lockout of the season, as Ascari qualified second for Ferrari. Farina started from third, while Consalvo Sanesi completed the front row in an additional Alfa Romeo. Fagioli could only manage fifth on the grid, alongside the fifth Alfa of Piero Taruffi, the second Ferrari of Dorino Serafini, and Sommer in a Talbot-Lago. Farina took the lead early on, with Ascari and Fangio not far behind. Ascari briefly held the lead but was forced to retire when his engine overheated. Two laps later, Fangio also retired due to problems with his gearbox. Taruffi's car, which was now running in second, was taken over by Fangio, although the Argentinian was forced to retire for the second time in the race, this time with engine problems. Ascari took over Serafini's car and ultimately finished second behind Farina, whose victory clinched the title by taking him three points clear of Fangio. Fagioli finished third in the race, and clinched the same position in the Drivers' Championship standings.

Championship review
In this first World Championship of Drivers, 14 teams (4 works and ten independent) participated, along with several privately entered cars, in the six European Grands Prix. Only US teams, constructors, and drivers participated in the Indianapolis 500. The chassis, engine, and car numbers varied from race to race.

Grands Prix

  The Indianapolis 500 was AAA-sanctioned and not run to Formula One regulations. It also counted towards the 1950 AAA Championship Car season.

Teams and drivers
The following teams and drivers competed in the 1950 FIA World Championship of Drivers.

World Championship of Drivers standings

Points were awarded on an 8–6–4–3–2 basis to the first five finishers at each Grand Prix, with an additional point awarded for setting the fastest lap. Only the best four results counting towards the championship. Numbers without parentheses are championship points; numbers in parentheses are total points scored.

 † Position shared between more drivers of the same car

Non-championship races
The following Formula One races, which did not count towards the World Championship of Drivers, were also held in 1950.

References

Formula One seasons